Idanis Del Valle Mendoza Conde (born 17 August 1988) is a Venezuelan footballer who plays as a centre-back for Argentine club UAI Urquiza. She has been a member of the Venezuela women's national team.

Early life
Mendoza was born in El Tigre.

Club career
Mendoza has played for Danz in Venezuela, for Colón FC (two stints) and Peñarol in Uruguay, for Alianza Petrolera FC in Colombia and for UAI Urquiza in Argentina.

International career
Mendoza capped for Venezuela at senior level during the 2010 Central American and Caribbean Games and the 2010 South American Women's Football Championship.

References

1988 births
Living people
People from El Tigre
Venezuelan women's footballers
Women's association football central defenders
Colón F.C. players
Alianza Petrolera F.C. players
Peñarol players
UAI Urquiza (women) players
Venezuela women's international footballers
Venezuelan expatriate women's footballers
Venezuelan expatriate sportspeople in Colombia
Expatriate women's footballers in Colombia
Venezuelan expatriate sportspeople in Uruguay
Expatriate women's footballers in Uruguay
Venezuelan expatriate sportspeople in Argentina
Expatriate women's footballers in Argentina